Scott Park Moffat (born 1 February 1973) is a South African-born former English cricketer. Moffat was a right-handed batsman who bowled right-arm off break. He was born at Germiston, Transvaal Province.

Moffat first appeared in county cricket for Hertfordshire, making his debut for the county in the 1993 Minor Counties Championship against Norfolk. He made nine further appearances for Hertfordshire in that competition, the last of which came against Bedfordshire in 1995. He also made a single MCCA Knockout Trophy appearance for the county in the 1996 MCCA Knockout Trophy against Wiltshire, it was in that same season that he made his first-class debut for Middlesex against Oxford University. He made four further first-class appearances for the county, the last of which came against Leicestershire in the 1997 County Championship. With the bat, he scored a total of 122, which came at an average of 20.33, with a high score of 47.

Moffat also played List A cricket for Middlesex, with his debut in that format coming against Essex in the 1997 Benson & Hedges Cup. He made seven further List A appearances for the county, the last of which came against Lancashire in the 1997 AXA Life League. In his eight List A appearances, he scored 139 runs at an average of 19.85, with a high score of 60. This score was his only half century in one-day cricket and came against Somerset in the Benson & Hedges Cup. Frustrated by a lack of opportunities, he left Middlesex at the end of the 1997 season.

References

External links
Scott Moffat at ESPNcricinfo
Scott Moffat at CricketArchive

1973 births
Living people
Sportspeople from Germiston
English people of South African descent
English cricketers
Hertfordshire cricketers
Middlesex cricketers